Erik Bakker (born 21 March 1990) is a Dutch former professional footballer who plays as a midfielder.

Club career
Bakker was born in Hoogeveen. He formerly played for FC Zwolle but left them for Cambuur in 2011.

On 27 December 2019, Bakker joined VV Staphorst after a short one-month spell at Finland with FC Honka from August to September.

Honours

Club
Cambuur
 Eerste Divisie (1): 2012–13

References

External links
 
 

1990 births
Living people
People from Hoogeveen
Association football midfielders
Dutch footballers
Dutch expatriate footballers
PEC Zwolle players
SC Cambuur players
De Graafschap players
FC Honka players
Eredivisie players
Eerste Divisie players
Veikkausliiga players
Dutch expatriate sportspeople in Finland
Expatriate footballers in Finland
Footballers from Drenthe